The 2017–18 STOK Elite Division is the 3rd season of the Cypriot fourth-level football league.

Format
Fourteen teams participated in the 2017–18 STOK Elite Division. All teams played against each other twice, once at their home and once away. The team with the most points at the end of the season crowned champions. The first three teams were promoted to the 2017–18 Cypriot Third Division and the last two teams were relegated to the regional leagues.

Point system
Teams received three points for a win, one point for a draw and zero points for a loss.

Changes from previous season
Teams promoted to 2017–18 Cypriot Third Division
 Onisilos Sotira 2014
 APEA Akrotiriou
 Finikas
 Elpida Astromeriti

Teams relegated from 2016–17 Cypriot Third Division
 Iraklis Gerolakkou
 Elpida Xylofagou
 AEN Ayiou Georgiou Vrysoullon-Acheritou

Teams promoted from regional leagues
 Omonia Psevda
 Elia Lythrodonta
 Poseidonas Giolou
 Rotsidis Mammari

Teams relegated to regional leagues
 ASPIS Pylas
 Koloni Geroskipou FC
 Lenas Limassol
 Spartakos Kitiou

Stadiums and locations

League standings

Results

Sources

See also
 STOK Elite Division
 2017–18 Cypriot First Division
 2017–18 Cypriot Second Division
 2017–18 Cypriot Third Division
 2017–18 Cypriot Cup for lower divisions

References

STOK Elite Division seasons
Cyprus
2017–18 in Cypriot football